RESTOL Special Rescue Squad is a 1999 South Korean animated television series created by Seoul Movie.

Plot 
In 2034, the future world experienced serious natural disasters. In 2035, GEONOID was established as a company in order to protect the earth against natural calamities. Furthermore, the organization set up SRS (Special Rescue Services) that consists of the orbiting rescue station R-SAT, five RESTOL units, and the Shell Diver carrier ship.

Kang Maru, a 14-year-old boy, was chosen by GEONOID via a simulation video game competition to pilot RESTOL unit 03, as he demonstrated superb skills.

Releases

Castings 
The following castings are based on Korean version.

 Kang Maru (강마루)—Choi Won-Hyeong
 Oming (오밍)—Kim Hye-Mi
 Mia (미아)—Kim Soo-Gyeong
 Punky (펑키)—Seong Byeong-Sook
 Heron (헤론)—Choi Byeong-Sang
 Lucifer (루시퍼)—Choi Byeong-Sang
 Victor (빅터)—Choi Byeong-Sang
 Reth (레스사령관)—Choi Moon-Ja
 Kou (코우선장)—Jang Gwang
 Kain (카인)—Kang Goo-Han
 Jin (진)—Kim Il
 Hanse (한스)—Lee Jeong-Goo
 Jei (제이)—Lim Eun-Jeong

External links 
 

1990s South Korean animated television series
1999 South Korean television series debuts
1999 South Korean television series endings
South Korean children's animated television series
Mecha animation
Animated television series about robots
South Korean children's animated science fiction television series